Folville is a surname. Notable people with the surname include:

Eugénie-Emilie Juliette Folville (born 1870), Belgian pianist, violinist, music educator, conductor and composer
Eustace Folville (died 1346), credited with killing the corrupt Sir Roger de Beler and leader of the Folville Gang
John Folville (d.1310), MP for Rutland in 1298 and 1301 and MP for Leicestershire from 1300 to 1306. Father of the Folville Gang
Mathew Folville, MP for Leicestershire in 1357
Phillip Folville, MP for Leicestershire in 1332
Ralph Folville, MP for Leicestershire in 1316 and 1318
Rev. Richard Folville (died 1340), member of the infamous robber band captained by his older brother Eustace
Simon Folville (d.1310), MP for Nottingham in 1318, 1322 and 1327

See also
Ashby Folville, village in the Melton district of Leicestershire, south west of Melton Mowbray
Ashby Folville Manor, late 19th century house in Neo-Tudor style in Ashby Folville
Folleville (disambiguation)
Fowlerville (disambiguation)
Foville